Nisoplaka ("island rock") is a small islet off the coast of the Greek island of Crete in the Libyan Sea. The islet is administered from Asterousia in Heraklion regional unit.

Landforms of Heraklion (regional unit)
Uninhabited islands of Crete
Islands of Greece